The Statue of Meidingu Nara Singh, also known as the Statue of Maharaja Narasingh, is a bronze sculpture located at the Kangla Sanathong, the western entrance gate to the Kangla Fort in Imphal. Meidingu Nara Singh (1844-1850 A.D.) was a Meitei monarch and the sovereign of Kangleipak.

History 

During April 2022, on the 172nd death anniversary of Meidingu Nara Singh, Manipur's chief minister Nongthombam Biren Singh announced that the Government of Manipur is planning to install a statue of the Meitei monarch at the western entrance gate to the Kangla Fort within 100 days.
The observation function was organised by Manipur State Archaeology, Department of Art and Culture, Government of Manipur.

To the public, Nongthombam Biren Singh announced the following:

Chief Minister Nongthombam Biren, recalling the struggles of Meidingu Nara Singh and others during the Seven Years Devastation, said:

On the occasion of the very 172nd death anniversary, Manipur's Rajya Sabha Member of Parliament Leishemba Sanajaoba, who is also the current titular King of Manipur, said,

Opening 
On 15 June 2022, the Government of Manipur, led by Chief Minister Nongthombam Biren Singh, unveiled the statue of Meidingu Narasingh, which was built next to the Kangla Sanathong, the western entrance gate to the Kangla Fort in Imphal.

The bronze sculpture of Meidingu Nara Singh was unveiled at the western entrance gate to the Kangla Fort, under the aegis of the Department of Arts and Culture, Government of Manipur.
The unveiling ceremony was participated by Dr RK Nimai Singh, Arts and Culture Commissioner, L. Birendra, Elangbam Sonamani and R.K. Modhuchandra, the senior most person of the Ningthouja dynasty, the clan of Meidingu Nara Singh. The sculpture was crafted by S. Nimai, a sculpture teacher of Imphal Art College. It took him five years to complete the artwork.

See also 
 Mount Manipur Memorial
 Kanglasha
 Cultural depictions of lions
 First N. Biren Singh ministry
 Second N. Biren Singh ministry

Notes

References

External links 

 
 

2022 sculptures
Bronze sculptures in India
Colossal statues in India
Cultural heritage of India
Equestrian statues in India
Landmarks in India
Meitei culture
Monuments and memorials in India
Monuments and memorials in Imphal
Monuments and memorials in Manipur
Monuments and memorials to Meitei people
Monuments and memorials to Meitei royalties
Outdoor sculptures in India
Public art in India
Tourist attractions in India